For the English barrister and first-class cricketer, see Evan Nepean (cricketer).

Sir Evan Nepean, 1st Baronet, PC FRS (9 July 1752 – 2 October 1822) was a British politician and colonial administrator. He was the first of the Nepean Baronets.

Family
Nepean was born at St. Stephens near Saltash, Cornwall, the second of three sons of Nicholas Nepean, an innkeeper, and his second wife, Margaret Jones. His father was Cornish and his mother was from South Wales. The name "Nepean" is thought to come from the village of Nanpean ("the head of the valley"), in Cornwall.

Nepean married Margaret Skinner, the only daughter of Capt. William Skinner, on 6 June 1782 at the Garrison Church at Greenwich. They had eight children, including Sir Molyneux Hyde Nepean, 2nd Bt., and Maj.-Gen. William Nepean, whose daughter Anna Maria Nepean married General Sir William Parke. Their youngest child, Rev. Canon Evan Nepean, became the Canon of Westminster and a Chaplain in Ordinary to Queen Victoria. His grandson Charles was a Middlesex county cricketer who also played football. Other descendants of Nepean include actors Hugh Grant (born 1960) and Thomas Brodie-Sangster (born 1990), who by chance both appeared in the same film, Love Actually.

Career
He was promoted to purser in 1775. During the American Revolutionary War he served as secretary to Admiral Molyneux Shuldham, in Boston in 1776 and again at Plymouth (1777–78).

On 3 March 1782 (aged only 29) he was appointed Permanent Under-Secretary of State for the Home Department. In this position, he came to have responsibility for naval and political intelligence which led to him running a network of spies across Europe.  He served there until December 1791, when he became Under-Secretary of State for War in 1794, Secretary to the Board of Admiralty 1795–1804, Chief Secretary for Ireland 1804–1805, Commissioner of the Admiralty, and then Governor of Bombay 1812–1819.

He was Member of Parliament for Queenborough from 1796 till 1802, then moving to Bridport where he remained until 1812. The Bridport Town Hall, designed by architect William Tyler RA, was given a clock tower with cupola, in about 1805, by Sir Evan. He was made a baronet in 1802 and was admitted to the Privy Council of the United Kingdom in 1804.

In 1820 he was made a member of the Royal Society. In 1822 he was appointed Sheriff of Dorset but died in office the same year at his estate at Loders.

Legacy
Places named after Evan Nepean include:

 Australia - the Nepean River in New South Wales, the Nepean Highway and Point Nepean both in Victoria, Nepean Bay in South Australia and Nepean Island in the external territory of Norfolk Island.
 Canada - the former city of Nepean, Ontario, Nepean Point, Nepean Bay.
 India - the Nepean Road and Nepean Sea Road in Mumbai.

Arms

References

Notes

Sources

External links

The Nepean Museum
History of the Home Office 1782-1982
History of Parliament biography

1752 births
1822 deaths
People from Saltash
Lords of the Admiralty
Members of the Privy Council of the United Kingdom
Governors of Bombay
Baronets in the Baronetage of the United Kingdom
Politicians from Cornwall
Members of the Parliament of Great Britain for English constituencies
British MPs 1796–1800
Members of the Parliament of the United Kingdom for English constituencies
UK MPs 1801–1802
UK MPs 1802–1806
UK MPs 1806–1807
UK MPs 1807–1812
High Sheriffs of Dorset
Royal Navy officers
Permanent Under-Secretaries of State for the Home Department
Fellows of the Royal Society
Members of the Privy Council of Ireland
Commissioners of the Treasury for Ireland
Chief Secretaries for Ireland